Pablo José Gallardo Zurera (born 19 February 1986) is a Spanish footballer who plays for CD Ciudad de Lucena as a central defender.

Club career
Born in Seville, Andalusia, Gallardo joined Sevilla FC's youth system at the age of 12. He made his senior debut with the reserves, but totalled only 28 Segunda División B games in his first three seasons, achieving promotion in 2007.

Gallardo first appeared in Segunda División on 30 September 2007, playing the full 90 minutes in a 1–0 away win against SD Eibar. He was first choice in that and the following seasons, with the team being relegated in the latter.

On 6 July 2009, free agent Gallardo signed a two-year contract with neighbouring Recreativo de Huelva also in the second level. He played just 11 competitive matches during his stint.

Subsequently, Gallardo plied his trade in division three, with Deportivo Alavés (where he suffered a serious hip injury), CF Badalona and Burgos CF. On 30 January 2015, after an unassuming spell in the Indian Super League with Sporting Clube de Goa, he returned to his country and its third tier, with Arroyo CP.

Gallardo spent the 2015–16 campaign in the Hong Kong Premier League, with Metro Gallery FC. In the summer of 2016 he returned to the Indian top flight, joining three compatriots (including manager José Francisco Molina) at Atlético de Kolkata.

On 26 July 2017, Dreams Sports Club confirmed that they had signed Gallardo. In May 2019, he left the club.

Club statistics

References

External links

1986 births
Living people
Footballers from Seville
Spanish footballers
Association football defenders
Segunda División players
Segunda División B players
Tercera División players
Sevilla Atlético players
Recreativo de Huelva players
Deportivo Alavés players
CF Badalona players
Burgos CF footballers
Sporting Clube de Goa players
ATK (football club) players
Hong Kong Premier League players
Dreams Sports Club players
Spain youth international footballers
Spanish expatriate footballers
Expatriate footballers in India
Expatriate footballers in Hong Kong
Spanish expatriate sportspeople in India
Spanish expatriate sportspeople in Hong Kong